Parliamentary elections were held in the Slovak Socialist Republic on 23 and 24 May 1986 alongside national elections. All 150 seats in the National Council were won by the National Front. The Communist Party of Slovakia, the Party of Slovak Revival, the Freedom Party and independents were all represented in Parliament.

Results

References

Slovakia
Parliamentary elections in Slovakia
Legislative elections in Czechoslovakia
One-party elections
Slovakia